The Nigerian Nationwide League Division Two (2) is the fourth level of club  football in Nigeria, and the middle of the three Nationwide league divisions. It is divided into eight groups by geography with five to eight teams each. Every year, up to eight teams (the section champions) are promoted to the Nationwide Division One.

External links
Good Hope FC banned
Amateur League Season Begins On Saturday (allafrica.com)
Polavis Hires Jebba As Technical Adviser
Nigeria Referees' website with fixtures

4
Sports leagues established in 2001
2001 establishments in Nigeria